Herbie Mann's African Suite (also released as St. Thomas) is an album by American jazz flautist Herbie Mann recorded in 1959 and first released on the United Artists label. The album was originally released under Johnny Rae's leadership due to Mann's contractual relationship with Verve Records.

Reception

AllMusic awarded the album 2 stars.

Track listing
All compositions by Herbie Mann except as indicated
 "St. Thomas" (Sonny Rollins) - 8:05
 "Sorimao" - 5:15
 "Jungle Fantasy" (Esy Morales) - 7:45
 "Bedouin" - 4:40
 "Sudan" - 3:50
 "Ekunda" - 3:10
 "Guinean" - 4:20

Personnel 
Herbie Mann - flute, bass clarinet
Johnny Rae - vibraphone
Bob Corwin - piano
Jack Six - bass
Philly Joe Jones - drums (tracks 1-3)
Carlos "Patato" Valdes, Victor Pantoja - congas
José Mangual - bongos

References 

1959 albums
Herbie Mann albums
Albums produced by Tom Wilson (record producer)
United Artists Records albums